Sin Disease was Scaterd Few's first full-length studio album. CCM magazine described the release as "pure punk for dread people," stating that it was a cross between Jane's Addiction and Charlie Mingus.

Track listing
 "Kill the Sarx"
 "While Reprobate"
 "Beggar"
 "Lights Out"
 "Later (L.A. 1989)"
 "Groovy"
 "Glass God"
 "As the Story Grows"
 "U"
 "A Freedom Cry"
 "Scapegoat"
 "Wonder Why"
 "DITC"
 "Self"
 "Look Into My Side"
 "Kill the Sarx II"

Credits

 Omar Domkus: bass guitar, background vocals
 Rämald Domkus: vocals, electric / acoustic guitars, keyboard, percussion
 Jamie Mitchell: electric guitars, background vocals
 Samuel West: percussion, background vocals
 Additional string arrangements on "Look Into My Side" by Terry Taylor
 Riki Michele - Female Vocals on "A Freedom Cry" (of Adam Again, courtesy of Broken Records)
 "Shouters" in the mountains of Zion:
 Tony Shore
 Riki
 Brian Miller
 Terry
 Ramald
 Omar
 Children on "Lights Out"
 Angela Blakely
 David
 Jenae Ramirez
 Xaundelle Aguirre
 Additional BGV's Jav
 Additional keys on "Look Into My Side": Drew Domkus
 Additional guitars: Tools, Ed Lover
 Greg Lawless courtesy of Broken Records
 Greg Flesch - lounge piano and horns on "Kill the Sarx II", additional guitars
 Voices - Terry, Ramald, Sam and Omar

Terry Taylor wrote a short history and introduction to the band in the album's liner notes. Liner Notes

Allan also sings "Later" and "Self" on Dighayzoose Ascension 7: Rocketship to Heaven.

References

1990 debut albums
Scaterd Few albums